The Rink Hockey Female European Championship is a competition between the female national teams in all Europe. It takes place every two years and it is organized by the World Skate Europe - Rink Hockey.

Winners

Medal table

See also
Rink Hockey European Championship
World Skate Europe - all competitions

External links
 Official website of the 11th Women's Roller Hockey Euro Cup 2011 
 List of ladies winners and places from 1992 to 2002

References

European Women's Roller Hockey Championship
Women's roller hockey
Recurring sporting events established in 1991